The HDMS Gunnar Thorson is a Danish environmental protection vessel built for environmental protection and preservation purposes in 1980-1981. Originally operated by the Danish Ministry of Environmental Protection (now Ministry of the Environment), Gunnar Thorson was crewed by the Royal Danish Navy throughout its history, but was not fully incorporated into the Navy until January 1, 1996.

Gunnar Thorson is a lead ship of a class of two EPVs, the other being .

Sources

 Royal Danish Navy fleet register
 Gunnar Thorson on Danish Naval History portal ship specifications

1981 ships
Naval ships of Denmark